was a town located in Hakui District, Ishikawa Prefecture, Japan.
As of 2003, the town had an estimated population of 8,429 and a density of 157.79 persons per km². The total area was 53.42 km².

On March 1, 2005, Oshimizu, along with the town of Shio (also from Hakui District), was merged to create the town of Hōdatsushimizu and no longer exists as an independent municipality.

External links
 Official website of Hōdatsushimizu 

Dissolved municipalities of Ishikawa Prefecture
Hōdatsushimizu, Ishikawa